Poland competed at the 1956 Summer Olympics in Melbourne, Australia. 64 competitors, 49 men and 15 women, took part in 48 events in 9 sports.

Medals

Athletics

Men
Track & road events

Field events

Women
Track & road events

Field events

Boxing

Men

Canoeing

Sprint
Men

Women

Fencing

Six fencers, all men, represented Poland in 1956.

 Men
Ranks given are within the pool.

Gymnastics

Artistic
Women

Rowing

Poland had eight male rowers participate in three out of seven rowing events in 1956.

Men

Shooting

Two shooters represented Poland in 1956, with Adam Smelczyński winning a silver medal in the trap event.

Men

Swimming

Women

Weightlifting

Men

References

External links
Official Olympic Reports
International Olympic Committee results database

Nations at the 1956 Summer Olympics
1956
1956 in Polish sport